Don Albert Pardee (March 29, 1837 – September 26, 1919) was a United States circuit judge of the United States Court of Appeals for the Fifth Circuit and of the United States Circuit Courts for the Fifth Circuit.

Education and career

Born on March 29, 1837, in Wadsworth, Ohio, Pardee read law in 1859. He entered private practice in Medina County, Ohio from 1859 to 1861. He served in the United States Army from 1861 to 1866, during the American Civil War. He resumed private practice in New Orleans, Louisiana from 1865 to 1868. He was a register in bankruptcy in New Orleans in 1867. He was a Judge for the Louisiana District Court for the Second Judicial District from 1868 to 1880. He was nominated by President Ulysses S. Grant to serve as a United States district judge of the United States District Court for the District of Louisiana on December 14, 1874, and March 9, 1875, however, the United States Senate did not vote on either nomination. He was a delegate to the Louisiana constitutional convention in 1879. He was the Republican Party candidate for Attorney General of Louisiana in 1879. He resumed private practice in New Orleans from 1880 to 1881.

Federal judicial service

Pardee was nominated by President James A. Garfield on March 14, 1881, to a seat on the United States Circuit Courts for the Fifth Circuit vacated by Judge William Burnham Woods. He was confirmed by the United States Senate on May 13, 1881, and received his commission the same day. Pardee was assigned by operation of law to additional and concurrent service on the United States Court of Appeals for the Fifth Circuit on June 16, 1891, to a new seat authorized by 26 Stat. 826 (Evarts Act). On December 31, 1911, the Circuit Courts were abolished and he thereafter served only on the Court of Appeals. His service terminated on September 26, 1919, due to his death in Atlanta, Georgia. He was President Garfield's longest serving judicial appointee.

References

Sources

 
 

1837 births
1919 deaths
19th-century American judges
Georgia (U.S. state) Republicans
Judges of the United States circuit courts
Judges of the United States Court of Appeals for the Fifth Circuit
Louisiana Republicans
Louisiana state court judges
Ohio Republicans
People of Ohio in the American Civil War
Union Army officers
United States federal judges appointed by James A. Garfield
United States federal judges admitted to the practice of law by reading law